South to Karanga is a 1940 American action adventure film directed by Harold D. Schuster starring James Craig, Luli Deste and Charles Bickford.

Production
The film was originally called Bombay Uprising but was relocated from India to Africa out of fear of offending British audiences. It was known as South to Katanga before being changed to South to Karanga. Dick Foran was to play to lead but fell ill and was replaced by James Craig.

Cast
 Charles Bickford as Jeff Worthing
 James Craig as Steve Hawley
 Luli Deste as Julia Garrett
 John Sutton as David Wallace
 Maurice Moscovitch as Paul Stacco
 Paul Hurst as Slats
 Abner Biberman as Manek Sen
 Ben Carter as Higgins
 Frank Reicher as Doctor Greenleaf
 Addison Richards as Edmund Daniels
 Joseph Crehan as Ridgley

References

External links
 
 
 South to Karanga at BFI
 Film review: 

1940 films
American action adventure films
1940s English-language films
Films directed by Harold D. Schuster
1940s action adventure films
American black-and-white films
Films set in Africa
Universal Pictures films
1940s American films